Elections to the French National Assembly were held in Ivory Coast on 2 January 1956 as part of the wider parliamentary elections. The African Democratic Rally won both seats, which were taken by Félix Houphouët-Boigny and Daniel Ouezzin Coulibaly.

Results

References

Ivory
1956 in Ivory Coast
Elections in Ivory Coast
Election and referendum articles with incomplete results
Ivory Coast
1956, Ivory Coast